Anatomy of a Genocide: The Life and Death of a Town called Buczacz is a 2018 book by historian Omer Bartov exploring ethnic relations between Poles, Ukrainians, and Jews in the town of Buczacz (now Buchach, Ukraine) with a focus on the Holocaust.

Background

The author, Omer Bartov, is a professor of European history at Brown University. His mother was raised in the town of Buczacz, then part of Poland, in the interwar era,  and emigrated to Israel before the war; the rest of her family was murdered during the Holocaust. Bartov began work on the book in the mid-1990s after interviewing his mother and realizing that genocide "was determined not only by the encounter between external killers and local residents, but also by the existing social fabric long before the arrival of the génocidaires". While writing the book, he ended up with too much material and decided to split the project into two books, one that focused on the experiences of those who lived in Buczacz 1848–1914 and later emigrated, which he plans to publish separately.

Publication history
The book was published in English by Simon & Schuster in 2018. In 2020, the book was published in Hebrew translation by Am Oved. In 2021, the book was published by Suhrkamp Verlag in German translation.

Content

Reception
Historian Grzegorz Rossoliński-Liebe states that Bartov wrote "an important and in many ways innovative study" that elucidated the Holocaust in Galicia. "The combination of the micro-historic approach with the history of a town and the concentration on everyday life and intimate facets of the Holocaust revises our understanding of how the genocide actually took place on the local level and what it caused."

Historian Havi Dreifuss states

Awards
The book received the National Jewish Book Award for the best 2018 book on the Holocaust.

References

Further reading
Non-English reviews

Related book

External links
Book lecture at the National WWII Museum

History books about the Holocaust
Buchach
2018 non-fiction books
Simon & Schuster books